The Xar file format is the fully specified vector graphics file format of Xara and Xara Photo & Graphic Designer.

External links
 Xara homepage
 Complete documentation of the XAR file format

Vector graphics file formats